Oum El Bouaghi is a municipality in Algeria. It is the capital of Oum El Bouaghi Province.

Localities  of the commune 
The commune of Oum El Bouaghi  is composed of 25 localities

References 

Communes of Oum El Bouaghi Province
Province seats of Algeria
Cities in Algeria
Algeria